Tomáš Cibulec and Pavel Vízner were the defending champions, but competed this year with different partners. Cibulec teamed up with Petr Pála and lost in the first round to Guillermo Cañas and Feliciano López, while Vízner teamed up with Jared Palmer and lost in the first round to Simon Aspelin and Todd Perry.

Jiří Novák and Radek Štěpánek won the title by defeating Simon Aspelin and Todd Perry 6–2, 6–4 in the final.

Seeds

Draw

Draw

References

External links
 Main draw (ATP)
 ITF tournament profile

Stuttgart Doubles
Doubles 2004